The Table Bay Harbour 0-4-0ST of 1881 was a South African steam locomotive from the pre-Union era in the Cape of Good Hope.

Between 1881 and 1893, three 0-4-0 saddle-tank locomotives entered construction service at the Table Bay Harbour in Cape Town. They were built to Brunel gauge for breakwater construction and were virtually identical to thirteen Cape gauge locomotives which entered service as dock shunters in Table Bay Harbour between 1881 and 1904.

Manufacturers
Three 0-4-0 saddle-tank locomotives were acquired by the Table Bay Harbour Board in Cape Town between 1881 and 1893. They were built to  Brunel gauge for service as breakwater construction engines on the Table Bay Harbour improvement project. The project had been started in 1860 and involved the excavation of two basins and the construction of breakwater piers. The locomotives were delivered in two batches from Black, Hawthorn & Co, numbers 4 and 5 in 1881 and no. 8 in 1893.

Characteristics
The locomotives were virtually identical to thirteen Cape gauge 0-4-0ST locomotives which entered service as dock shunters in Table Bay Harbour between 1881 and 1904. Apart from the gauge difference, the Brunel gauge engines had larger bore cylinders of  diameter, compared to the  bore of the Cape gauge engines. Both engine types had domeless boilers with a sandbox mounted in the centre of the saddle tank.

Service
By the time the broad gauge Table Bay Harbour construction railway was closed in 1904, engine no. 4 was no longer reflected in the Table Bay Harbour Board's locomotive register and had presumably already been scrapped. Engine no. 8 was sold as scrap to Vaggens & Company in May 1907. Engine no. 5 could possibly have been regauged to Cape gauge and put to work as dock shunter in Table Bay Harbour, but this has not been confirmed and it is more likely that it was staged at the Salt River workshops and used as a source of spare parts until it was scrapped there in May 1913.

Works numbers and disposition
The numbers, works numbers, dates ordered and disposition of these locomotives are listed in the table.

References

0970
0-4-0ST locomotives
B locomotives
7 ft ¼ in gauge locomotives
Black, Hawthorn locomotives
Railway locomotives introduced in 1881
1881 in South Africa
Scrapped locomotives